Red Hill Pass, is situated in the Eastern Cape, province of South Africa, on the regional road R352, between Keiskammahoek and King Williams Town.

Mountain passes of the Eastern Cape